Wang Gang (born December 22, 1948) is a Chinese actor and host. He is best known for his role as Heshen, a corrupt Qing Dynasty official favoured by the Qianlong Emperor, in many television series. He first came to prominence in 1986 for hosting the CCTV New Year's Gala. Wang has also hosted the CCTV programme Friends since 2000. He won a Golden Eagle Award for Best Supporting Actor in 1997 for his performance in Liu the Hunchback Chancellor (宰相刘罗锅). He also hosts Liaoning TV's talk show Wang Gang Telling Stories.

Personal life
Wang has married three times. He married his first wife announcer Xiao Du in 1978, with whom he had a daughter, Wang Tingting. The couple divorced in 1979.

Wang married for the second time in October 1996, to singer Cheng Fangyuan, they divorced in 2001.

On 8 November 2006, Wang married a woman named Zheng Yandong he met on the internet in 2005 and has been chatting with since then. In August 2008, when Wang was around 60 years old, his wife gave birth to their son: Wang Yiding.

Filmography

Film

Television

Autobiography

Awards

References

External links
 Wang Gang on Sina.com

1948 births
Male actors from Changchun
Living people
Chinese male voice actors
Hui male actors
Chinese television presenters
Chinese male film actors
Chinese male television actors